Yangsu Station is a station on the Gyeongui-Jungang Line in South Korea.

External links
 Station information from Korail

Seoul Metropolitan Subway stations
Railway stations opened in 1939
Metro stations in Yangpyeong County